Antelope Hills may refer to several places or geographic features in the US:

Communities
 Antelope Hills, California, Kern County, California
 Antelope Hills, Colorado, Arapahoe County, Bennett, Colorado
 Antelope Hills, Wyoming, Natrona County, Wyoming

Other uses
 One of a list of mountain ranges named Antelope

See also
 Antelope Hill, Arizona
 Angora, Nebraska, also called Antelope Hill